Palaquium grande is a species of plant in the family Sapotaceae. It is endemic to Sri Lanka.

References

grande
Endemic flora of Sri Lanka
Trees of Sri Lanka
Taxonomy articles created by Polbot